Beaurieux is a commune in the département of Aisne in Hauts-de-France in northern France.

At this site, the remnants of an iron-age farm have been excavated by Le Greves. He found that the site was slowly adapted to form a Gallo-Roman villa.

Population

References

Communes of Aisne
Aisne communes articles needing translation from French Wikipedia